Domine is vocative of the Latin for "Lord!"

Domine may also refer to:
 Domine (clergyman), an old English term for a parson
 Domine (fish), a tropical fish
 Domine (band), an Italian power metal band started in the mid-1980s

See also
 The Church of Domine Quo Vadis is a small church southeast of Rome.
 De Havilland Dominie, a British liaison aircraft of World War II
 De Profundis Clamavi Ad Te Domine is the first live album by black metal band Dark Funeral
 Domine Database, a public database of protein domain-domain interactions
 Domine Non Es Dignus is the second studio album by British black metal group Anaal Nathrakh.
 Domine quo vadis? is a painting by the Italian Baroque painter Annibale Carracci.
 Exsurge Domine is a papal bull issued on June 15, 1520, by Pope Leo X. 
 Non nobis Domine is a short Latin hymn used as a prayer of thanksgiving 
 Parce Domine is a Roman Catholic antiphon. 
 Pie Pelicane, Jesu, Domine is a liturgical hymn of benediction.
 Veni Domine, a Christian progressive doom metal band.
 Astronomy Domine, a song by Pink Floyd